Charles Edward Clark Jr. (born April 19, 1995) is an American football strong safety for the New York Jets of the National Football League (NFL). He played college football at Virginia Tech. Clark was drafted by the Baltimore Ravens in the sixth round of the 2017 NFL Draft.

Early life
Clark went to King's Fork High School in Suffolk, Virginia. He played American football, basketball, and ran track. At his position, he was rated as the no. 68 safety in the country, the no. 145 player in his region, and the 34th-ranked player in the state by ESPN.

College career
While at Virginia Tech, Clark started in 40 of 52 games and had a total of 292 tackles.

Professional career
Clark attended the NFL Scouting Combine and was listed as a cornerback. On March 15, 2017, Clark attended Virginia Tech’s Pro Day and chose to run the 40-yard dash (4.56s), 20-yard dash (2.65s), 10-yard dash (1.59s), and vertical jump (33 1/2 in). Unfortunately, Clark was unable to improve upon his combine numbers. At the conclusion of the pre-draft process, Clark was projected to be a sixth to seventh round pick or to go undrafted by NFL draft experts and scouts. He was ranked as the 11th best free safety prospect available in the draft by DraftScout.com.

Baltimore Ravens

2017
The Baltimore Ravens selected Clark in the sixth round with the 186th overall pick in the 2017 NFL Draft. Clark was the 17th safety drafted in 2017 and was the first of four players drafted from Virginia Tech.

On May 5, 2017, the Baltimore Ravens signed Clark to a four-year, $2.57 million contract that included a signing bonus of $174,807. Throughout training camp, Clark competed for a roster spot as a backup safety and special teams player. Head coach John Harbaugh named Clark the third free safety on the depth chart, behind veterans Eric Weddle and Lardarius Webb, to start the regular season.

He made his professional regular season debut in the Baltimore Ravens’ season-opening 20–0 victory at the Cincinnati Bengals, but did not register a statistic. The following week, Clark made his first tackle of his career during a 24–10 win against the Cleveland Browns in Week 2. Clark made his tackle on Jabrill Peppers during an 18-yard kick return by Peppers in the second quarter. Clark was inactive as a healthy scratch for the Baltimore Ravens’ 23–20 loss at the Tennessee Titans in Week 9. On December 31, 2017, Clark collected a season-high three solo tackles during a 31–27 loss against the Cincinnati Bengals in Week 17. The following day, it was announced that defensive coordinator Dean Pees had officially announced his retirement. He finished his rookie season with a total of 13 combined tackles (12 solo) and two pass deflections in 15 games and zero starts.

The Baltimore Ravens did not qualify for the playoffs after finishing second in the AFC North with a 9–7 record.

2018
Clark entered training camp as a backup safety with Eric Weddle and Tony Jefferson established as the starters. Head coach John Harbaugh named Clark the primary backup free safety, behind Eric Weddle, to begin the regular season.

On December 2, 2018, Clark earned his first career start after Tony Jefferson sustained an ankle injury the previous week and remained inactive for two consecutive games. Clark finished the Ravens’ 26–16 victory at the Atlanta Falcons with four combined tackles (three solo). In Week 14, Clark recorded four combined tackles (three solo), deflected a pass, and made his first career interception during a 27–24 loss at the Kansas City Chiefs. Clark intercepted a pass by quarterback Patrick Mahomes, that was intended for wide receiver Tyreek Hill, and returned it for a five-yard gain in the second quarter. He finished the season with 21 combined tackles (16 solo), one pass deflection, and an interception in 16 games and two starts.

The Baltimore Ravens finished the 2018 NFL season atop the AFC North with a 10–6 record, clinching a playoff berth. On January 6, 2019, Clark appeared in his first career playoff game as the Ravens lost 23–17 to the Los Angeles Chargers in the AFC Wild Card Round.

2019

Clark retained his role as the backup free safety, behind Tony Jefferson, in his second season under defensive coordinator Don Martindale. In Week 6, Clark became the starting free safety for the remainder of the season after Tony Jefferson sustained a torn ACL during a 26–23 win at the Pittsburgh Steelers the previous week.

In week 13 of the 2019 season against the San Francisco 49ers, Clark made a team high 7 tackles and recorded a strip sack on Jimmy Garoppolo that was recovered by teammate Brandon Williams in the 20–17 win. In week 15 of the 2019 season, Clark recorded an interception off Sam Darnold in a 42–21 win over the New York Jets. During the 2019 season, Clark took over the role of communicator of the defense when he was selected to be the lone player with the headset in his helmet to relay playcalls to his teammates.

2020
On February 10, 2020, the Ravens signed Clark to a three-year, $15.30 million contract extension that includes $10 million guaranteed and a signing bonus of $5.50 million.

In Week 5 against the Cincinnati Bengals, Clark recorded his first sack of the season on Joe Burrow during the 27–3 win.
In Week 9 against the Indianapolis Colts, Clark recovered a fumble forced by teammate Marcus Peters on running back Jonathan Taylor and returned it for a 65-yard touchdown during the 24–10 win.

In Week 17 against the Cincinnati Bengals, Clark recorded his first interception of the season off a pass thrown by Brandon Allen during the 38–3 win.

2021
In Week 17 against the Los Angeles Rams, he recorded interceptions off Matthew Stafford on consecutive drives, including a Pick 6 on the first one, but the Ravens would lose 19–20. He also had seven tackles and three pass breakups during the game.

2022
Clark set career-highs in tackles in 2022, finishing second on the team in both total and solo tackles with 101 and 61 respectively. He also had the most assisted tackles with 40.

New York Jets
Clark was traded to the New York Jets in exchange for a 2024 seventh-round pick on March 15, 2023.

References

External links
Baltimore Ravens bio
Virginia Tech Hokies bio 

1995 births
Living people
American football safeties
Baltimore Ravens players
New York Jets players
Players of American football from Virginia
Sportspeople from Suffolk, Virginia
Virginia Tech Hokies football players